Wilfrid Noel Bond (27 December 1897 – 25 August 1937) was an English physicist and engineer known for his work in fluid mechanics. He received his Doctor of Science from the University of London, and was a lecturer at the University of Reading from 1921 until his death.  The Bond number, used in fluid mechanics to characterize the shape of bubbles and drops, is named after him.

Bibliography 
 An Introduction to Fluid Motion (1925)
 Numerical Examples in Physics (1931)
 Probability and Random Errors (1935)

References 

1897 births
1937 deaths
Alumni of the University of London
Academics of the University of Reading
English physicists
Fluid dynamicists
20th-century British engineers